Feydhoo may refer to:

 Feydhoo (Seenu Atoll) (now Addu Atoll), Maldives
 Feydhoo (Shaviyani Atoll), Maldives